Legacy is a residential neighbourhood in the southeast quadrant of Calgary, Alberta, Canada. It is located along Calgary's southern boundary with Foothills County, east of Macleod Trail, south of the community of Walden, and west of the Bow River. The Hamlet of Heritage Pointe is located across the city boundary in the MD of Foothills No. 31.

Legacy is located within Calgary City Council's Ward 14.

Demographics 
In the City of Calgary's 2016 municipal census, Legacy has a population of 2,359 living in 1,677 dwellings, a change of   since recording a population of 1,303 in 2015.

Education 
Legacy is home to All Saints High School, which has a student population capacity of 1,500.

See also 
 List of neighbourhoods in Calgary

References 

Neighbourhoods in Calgary